Glubokoye is a rural locality (a settlement) in Pyatovskoye Rural Settlement, Totemsky  District, Vologda Oblast, Russia. The population was 187 as of 2010. There are 3 streets.

Geography 
Glubokoye is located 3 km southwest of Totma (the district's administrative centre) by road. Zadnyaya is the nearest rural locality.

References 

Rural localities in Totemsky District